This is a list of listed buildings in the civil parish of Dalry in Dumfries and Galloway, Scotland. St John's Town of Dalry is the principal town in the civil parish of Dalry.

List 

|}

Key

Notes

References
 All entries, addresses and coordinates are based on data from Historic Scotland. This data falls under the Open Government Licence

Dalry